Per-Erik Larsson (3 May 1929 – 31 May 2008) was a Swedish cross-country skier who competed at the 1956 and 1960 Olympics. He won a bronze medal in the 4 × 10 km relay and finished seventh in the individual 30 km race in 1956. In the 15 km event he placed 12th and 17th in 1956 and 1960, respectively.

Larsson won two 4 × 10 km relay medals at the Nordic skiing World Championships with a gold in 1958 and a bronze in 1954.

Cross-country skiing results

Olympic Games
 1 medal – (1 bronze)

World Championships
 2 medals – (1 gold, 1 bronze)

References

External links
 Swedish Cross-country skiing medalists 1924–2002 
 World Championship results 
  Obituary

1929 births
2008 deaths
Swedish male cross-country skiers
Cross-country skiers at the 1956 Winter Olympics
Cross-country skiers at the 1960 Winter Olympics
Olympic medalists in cross-country skiing
FIS Nordic World Ski Championships medalists in cross-country skiing
Medalists at the 1956 Winter Olympics
Olympic bronze medalists for Sweden